Robert Melson may refer to:
 Robert Melson (political scientist)
 Robert Melson (murderer)

See also
 Robert Nelson (disambiguation)